Nicklaus Perbix (born June 15, 1998) is an American professional ice hockey defenseman currently playing with the  Tampa Bay Lightning of the National Hockey League (NHL). He was a member of United States national team at the 2022 Winter Olympics.

Playing career
Perbix was a star player for Elk River High School, scoring well over a point per game as a senior and being a finalist for the Mr. Hockey Award. After being selected by the Tampa Bay Lightning in the NHL Draft, he played a season of junior hockey for the Omaha Lancers before he began attending St. Cloud State University. He made an immediate splash in the college ranks, helping the Huskies finish atop the NCHC standings, and was named to the conference All-Rookie team. After his sophomore season was cut short due to the COVID-19 pandemic, Perbix came back the following year in good form and was instrumental in getting St. Cloud to the program's first NCAA championship appearance.

Perbix continued to increase his scoring output for his senior season and was firing at a point per game pace for most of the year. After the NHL announced that they wouldn't be sending any players to the Winter Olympics, Perbix was selected as a member of the team. On March 31, 2022, the Tampa Bay Lightning signed Perbix to a one-year, entry-level contract commencing in the  season. He was immediately assigned to join AHL affiliate, the Syracuse Crunch, on an amateur tryout contract for the remainder of the season.

On October 18, 2022, Perbix made his NHL debut with the Tampa Bay Lightning in a loss to the visiting Philadelphia Flyers at Amalie Arena. On October 26, 2022, Perbix recorded his first career NHL assist and point in a 4-2 victory over the Anaheim Ducks at the Honda Center.

On November 5, 2022, Perbix scored his first career NHL goal in a 5-3 Lightning win over the Buffalo Sabres.

On January 2, 2023, the Lightning signed Perbix to a two-year extension that would keep him as a member of the team through the 2024-2025 season.

Career statistics

Regular season and playoffs

International

Awards and honors

References

External links

1998 births
Living people
American men's ice hockey defensemen
Ice hockey people from Minnesota
Sportspeople from Minneapolis
Omaha Lancers players
Ice hockey players at the 2022 Winter Olympics
Olympic ice hockey players of the United States
St. Cloud State Huskies men's ice hockey players
Syracuse Crunch players
Tampa Bay Lightning draft picks
Tampa Bay Lightning players